Norbinaltorphimine (nor-BNI or nBNI) is an opioid antagonist used in scientific research. It is one of the few opioid antagonists available that is highly selective for the κ-opioid receptor, and blocks this receptor without affecting the μ- or δ-opioid receptors, although it has less selectivity in vivo than when used in isolated tissues. nor-BNI blocks the effects of κ-opioid agonists in animal models, and produces antidepressant and antipanic-like effects.

See also 
 Binaltorphimine
 5'-Guanidinonaltrindole
 JDTic

References 

4,5-Epoxymorphinans
Irreversible antagonists
Phenols
Tertiary alcohols
Kappa-opioid receptor antagonists